Chalybeothemis is a genus of dragonflies in the family Libellulidae. It contains three species native to Southeast Asia.

Species include:
Chalybeothemis chini
Chalybeothemis fluviatilis
Chalybeothemis pruinosa

References

Libellulidae
Anisoptera genera